Shirley Furlong (born December 5, 1959) is an American professional golfer who played on the LPGA Tour.

Furlong won once on the LPGA Tour in 1988.

Professional wins (2)

LPGA Tour wins (1)

LPGA Tour playoff record (1–0)

Futures Tour wins (1)
1984 Seven Springs Classic

References

External links

 Shirley Furlong Interview, Pursue The Passion, February 10, 2009.

American female golfers
Texas A&M Aggies women's golfers
LPGA Tour golfers
Golfers from San Antonio
1959 births
Living people